PDFTron Systems Incorporated is a Canadian software company headquartered in Vancouver, British Columbia. The company provides developer tools for enterprise PDF software.

History

Founded in 1998 by Catherine Andersz and Ivan Nincic, PDFTron was among the first companies outside of Adobe Systems to offer PDF development tools. Their core product, PDFNet SDK, has gone through many iterations since its introduction in 2002. They were early adopters of Microsoft Silverlight and XPS technologies, launching the PDF2XPS product within a year of the format standardization in 2007. Advancing into the mobile arena PDFNet now has capabilities in Windows Mobile, iOS, Android 
and HTML5. The HTML5 feature of their new WebViewer enables platform neutral document viewing and web annotation.

In 2019, PDFTron is teamed up with Silversmith Capital Partners and received growth investment of $71 million.

PDFTron continued growth in 2020 by acquiring BCL Technologies and ActivePDF, adding B2C solutions (PDFOnline and easyPDF converter) and server-side PDF automation tools to their portfolio. 

In 2022, PDFTron acquired iText, a provider of PDF Software, PDFlib GmbH, Germany-based innovator of dynamic, server-side PDF creation technology and eversign, GmbH, an Austrian e-signature platform for an undisclosed sum.

Products and clients

 PDFNet 
 WebViewer
 Xodo

Notable clients include Brother Industries, Thomson Reuters, Konica Minolta and Canon Inc.

Community

PDFTron has been a member of PDF Association since 2009. It is also member of the British Columbia Technology Industry Association (BCTIA), the Association for Information and Image Management AIIM 

In 2018, PDFTron CEO Catherine Andersz was elected to the PDF Association Board of Directors.

References

Software companies of Canada
PDF software